Santa Maria River on the Central Coast of California, is formed at the confluence of the Sisquoc River and Cuyama River, just east of the city of Santa Maria, and flows  to its delta at the Pacific Ocean.

The entire river defines the border between northern Santa Barbara County and southern San Luis Obispo County, up to the Sisquoc River, with a major bridge on Highway 101 passing over it.  The Santa Maria River Fault is a tectonic fault that roughly corresponds with the course of the river.

There are no dams or lakes on the Santa Maria River itself, although Twitchell Reservoir is formed by a dam on the tributary Cuyama River. Twitchell Dam was built by the United States Bureau of Reclamation and provides flood control and groundwater recharge of the aquifer. The Sisquoc River is also free-flowing, and a National Wild and Scenic Rivers System.

During much of the year, the Santa Maria River has very little water, but it can swell greatly during winter storms.

See also
 List of rivers of California

References

Rivers of Southern California
Rivers of Santa Barbara County, California
Rivers of San Luis Obispo County, California
Santa Maria, California